Khok Pho Chai is a district (amphoe) of Khon Kaen province, northeastern Thailand.

History
The minor district (king amphoe) was established on 30 April 1994 by splitting it from Mancha Khiri district.

On 15 May 2007, all 81 minor districts were upgraded to full districts. On 24 August the upgrade became official.

Geography
Neighboring districts are (from the north clockwise): Mancha Khiri, Chonnabot, and Waeng Yai of Khon Kaen Province; Khon Sawan and Kaeng Khro of Chaiyaphum province.

Administration
The district is divided into four subdistricts (tambons), which are further subdivided into 40 villages (mubans). The township (thesaban tambon) Ban Khok covers parts of tambon Ban Khok. There are a further four tambon administrative organizations (TAO).

References

External links
https://web.archive.org/web/20070929060754/http://www.khokphochaidoc.com/ Website of district (Thai)
amphoe.com

Khok Pho Chai